The 2012 Big Ten Football Championship Game was a college football game.  It was played on December 1, 2012, at Lucas Oil Stadium in Indianapolis, Indiana, to determine the 2012 champion of the Big Ten Conference. It was played between the Wisconsin Badgers of the Leaders Division and the Nebraska Cornhuskers of the Legends Division. Wisconsin defeated Nebraska, 70–31.

The game was the second football championship game ever played in the Big Ten's 116-year history; the Big Ten expanded to twelve teams the year before thus becoming eligible under NCAA rules which, at that time, required conferences to have a membership of at least 12 to have a conference championship game. The game was played in prime time and televised by Fox, with kickoff scheduled for 8:17 PM Eastern Time. In only the second year of the Big Ten Championship game, one team entered the game unranked in the BCS standings, AP poll, and Coaches' poll.

In 2014, both Nebraska and Wisconsin were placed in the new Big Ten West division for football, and thus it will no longer be possible for them to meet in the conference championship game without conference re-alignment.

Teams

Wisconsin

Wisconsin finished third place in the Leaders division, but division champion Ohio State and second-place Penn State were ineligible to play in the championship game because of postseason bans.  Teams that play in the conference championship game must be eligible for the postseason.

The 2012 Big Ten football championship game would be the last time Bret Bielema coached the Badgers. He departed Wisconsin three days after the Big Ten championship game to accept the head coaching position at Arkansas. Wisconsin's Athletic Director, and former football head coach, Barry Alvarez went on to coach the Badgers at the 2013 Rose Bowl against Stanford.

Nebraska

Scoring Summary
1st Quarter
WIS – Melvin Gordon 56 Yd Run for Td (Kyle French Kick) (13:01) (7–0 WIS)
WIS – Marcus Cromartie 29 Yd Interception Return for TD (Kyle French Kick) (12:53) (14–0 WIS)
NEB – Taylor Martinez 76 Yd Run for Td (Brett Maher Kick) (10:58) (14–7 WIS)
NEB – Brett Maher 32 Yd Fg (04:46) (14–10 WIS)
WIS – James White 9 Yd Run for Td (Kyle French Kick) (01:01) (21–10 WIS)

2nd Quarter
WIS – James White 1 Yd Run for Td (Kyle French Kick) (11:11) (28–10 WIS)
WIS – Montee Ball 16 Yd Run for Td  (Kyle French Kick) (07:15) (35–10 WIS)
WIS – Sam Arneson 3 Yd Pass From James White for Td (Kyle French Kick) (00:02) (42–10 WIS)

3rd Quarter
WIS – Montee Ball 9 Yd Run for Td (Jack Russell Kick) (14:13) (49–10 WIS)
NEB – Taylor Martinez 11 Yd Run for Td (Brett Maher Kick) (10:47) (49–17 WIS)
WIS – Montee Ball 57 Yd Run for Td (Jack Russell Kick) (09:27) (56–17 WIS)
WIS – James White 68 Yd Run for Td (Jack Russell Kick) (06:42) (63–17 WIS)

4th Quarter
NEB – Braylon Heard 9 Yd Run for Td (Brett Maher Kick) (12:14) (63–24 WIS)
WIS – James White 10 Yd Run for Td (Jack Russell Kick) (08:57) (70–24 WIS)
NEB – Imani Cross 26 Yd Run for Td (Brett Maher Kick) (00:51) (70–31 WIS)

Statistics

Sources:

Records
Montee Ball took over as the record holder for Football Bowl Subdivision "career rushing touchdowns record" from Travis Prentice with 76 touchdowns (Ball scored one touchdown in the 2013 Rose Bowl thus extending the record). Wisconsin set multiple school records in the game; first by scoring eight rushing touchdowns during the game. The second school record for Wisconsin was having two 200-yard rushers in one game. Nebraska set a record for the most rushing touchdowns allowed in a game. Wisconsin's redshirt freshman running back Melvin Gordon ran for a career-high of 216 yards on just nine possessions, averaging 24 yards per carry.

See also
 List of Big Ten Conference football champions

References

External links

Championship
Big Ten Football Championship Game
Nebraska Cornhuskers football games
Wisconsin Badgers football games
Big Ten Football Championship Game
Big Ten Football Championship Game
2010s in Indianapolis